Lovick is a given name. Notable people with the name include:

Lovick Friend KBE, CB, PC (1856–1944), British Army major general and cricketer
Lovick Pierce Thomas, I, quartermaster in the Confederate Army of the Confederate States of America, 1861–1863
Dale Lovick (born 1944), educator and former political figure in British Columbia, Canada
John Lovick, American magician, writer, director, and actor
Lovick Pierce, the father of Methodist Bishop George Foster Pierce

See also
Love Sick (disambiguation)
Lovesick (disambiguation)